Mónica Madariaga Gutiérrez (25 January 1942 – 8 October 2009) was a Chilean lawyer, academic, and politician, a state minister of the military dictatorship headed by her cousin, Augusto Pinochet, which ruled the country from 1973 to 1990.

Biography
She entered the law school of the University of Chile and graduated in 1966 with the thesis Derecho administrativo y seguridad jurídica (Administrative Law and Legal Security).

She worked at the office of the Comptroller General from 1962 to 1977.

When Augusto Pinochet headed the military junta, she was appointed Minister of Justice, serving from 1977 and 1983. At this time the Constitution of 1980, as well as Decree Law 2.191, better known as the  – which was drafted by Madariaga herself – were enacted.

Mónica Madariaga apologized in an interview granted in 1985 to the journalist Mónica González for the magazine , claiming to have lived in a "micro-reality" that did not allow her to see what was really happening in the country with regard to human rights violations. At the same time she blamed Jaime Guzmán and José Piñera for some of their actions.

After the country's return to democracy, she became the rector of Andrés Bello University. She was a Union of the Centrist Center candidate for senator for O'Higgins Region in the 1997 parliamentary election, but received 16.65% of votes and was not elected. Later she was director of the Law School of the University UNIACC.

From 2001 to 2003, she was active in the Independent Democratic Union (UDI).

Death
In 2004, Mónica Madariaga contracted an aggressive form of bone and breast cancer, which was initially contained, but then returned and metastasized to her lymphatic system. She died from cancer at 6:00 a.m. on 8 October 2009 at her home in the municipality of Las Condes.

Controversies
Mónica Madariaga was characterized by her strong personality, frank character, and divisive revelations and statements, which landed her in several controversies in the press.

She was a frequent guest on television programs precisely because of her openness to unveiling some episodes of the military regime, such as indicating the great influence that Lucía Hiriart exerted on her husband.

She caused a stir when, in an interview with the newspaper La Tercera in 2000, she affirmed that the leaders of the rightist UDI were indoctrinated in Colonia Dignidad.

Piñera denied the accusations, but Madariaga reaffirmed her statements, calling the Coalition for Change's presidential candidate a "liar".

References

1942 births
2009 deaths
20th-century Chilean lawyers
Academic staff of the Andrés Bello National University
Chilean Ministers of Education
Chilean Ministers of Justice
Chilean women lawyers
Deaths from cancer in Chile
Independent Democratic Union politicians
Ministers of the military dictatorship of Chile (1973–1990)
Politicians from Santiago
Union of the Centrist Center politicians
University of Chile alumni
Women government ministers of Chile
Female justice ministers
20th-century women lawyers
Government ministers of Chile
20th-century Chilean women politicians